Martin J. "Marty" Butler (April 18, 1924 – December 1, 1998) was an American politician and businessman.

Born in Chicago, Illinois, Butler served in the United States Army Air Forces during World War II. He was president of the Distributors Institute, Inc. Butler lived in Park Ridge, Illinois with his wife and family. He served on the Park Ridge City Council and as mayor of Park Ridge. In 1967, Butler formed the Homeowners Party when he ran for the Park Ridge City Council. Butler served in the Illinois Senate, as a Republican from 1991 until his death in 1998. Butler died of a heart attack.

Notes

External links

1924 births
1998 deaths
Politicians from Chicago
People from Park Ridge, Illinois
United States Army Air Forces personnel of World War II
Military personnel from Illinois
Businesspeople from Illinois
Illinois Independents
Illinois Republicans
Illinois city council members
Mayors of places in Illinois
Illinois state senators
20th-century American politicians
20th-century American businesspeople
Deaths from coronary thrombosis